DJ-Kicks: Chromeo is a DJ mix album, mixed by Canadian duo Chromeo. It was released on September 29, 2009 under the Studio !K7 independent record label as part of their DJ-Kicks series.

Track listing
 "Ikeya-Seki" - Kano
 "J'aime danser avec toi" - Pierre Perpall
 "Moving Up" - Toba
 "Gonna Get Over You" - France Joli
 "Serious" - Donna Allen
 "Maybe Tonight" - Lovelock
 "Solar Antapex" - Chateau Marmont
 "Seduction" - Val Young
 "Larmes de métal" - Soupir
 "Sequencer" - Lifelike
 "Time to Move" - Carmen
 "Don't You Wanna Make Love" - Shotgun
 "Murphy's Law" - Chéri
 "Easy to Love" - Leo Sayer
 "Luckier" - Shazam
 "I Can't Tell You Why (DJ Kicks)" - Chromeo
 "Dans tes yeux" - Diane Tell
 "Pipeline" - The Alan Parsons Project

References

External links 
Official site
DJ-Kicks website
Chromeo - DJ Kicks at Discogs

Chromeo albums
DJ-Kicks albums
2009 compilation albums